Karl Kiffe (July 6, 1925 – May 10, 2004) was an American jazz drummer featured in specialty numbers in a number of Hollywood feature films during World War II and later as a featured member of Jimmy Dorsey's orchestra.

Career
Born in Los Angeles, Kiffe first attracted attention as winner of the annual Gene Krupa Contest in 1943. Succeeding Chuck Falkner as leader of the Hollywood Canteen Kids, Kiffe was featured in novelty numbers in several feature films before working as a single in Ken Murray's Blackouts. In July 1945 he was hired by Jimmy Dorsey, with whom he worked for about a year, and then again from July 1950 through February '53. Over the next decade, Kiffe worked with, among others, Stan Getz, Zoot Sims, Charlie Shavers, Red Norvo and Woody Herman, as well as singers Andy Williams, June Christy, and Ella Fitzgerald.

Speaking in 1946, when asked which drummer he most admired, Kiffe cited the solos of Buddy Rich, while praising the big band work of Don Lamond and Jo Jones.

Personal life
In 1958, Kiffe married Carol Jean Beall in Las Vegas. They had two children.

Autobiography: https://docs.google.com/document/d/1Cx1QjSAnwCIm3G4eWqoOzI_LQmDoFeXivfXkORfsBaY/edit?usp=sharing

Filmography

Film
Johnny Doughboy (1942)
Song of the Open Road (1944)
Youth Aflame (1944)
Jimmy Dorsey's Varieties (1952)

Television
Stars of Jazz (With Red Norvo, April 21, 1958)
The Ed Sullivan Show (with Benny Goodman, November 6, 1960)

Discography

As sideman
With Jimmy Dorsey
 At the 400 Restaurant 1946 (HEP, 1994; rec. 1946)
 Casino Gardens Ballroom 1946 (HEP, 1999; rec. 1946) 
 More (Jazz Crusade, 1950)
 One Night Stand with Jimmy Dorsey at the Statler (Joyce, 198_; rec. November 1951)
 The Swingin' Dorseys (Decca, 195_)

With others
 Georgie Auld, That's Auld (Discovery, 1950)
 Don Stratton, Modern Jazz With Dixieland Roots (ABC-Paramount, 1956)
 Red Norvo, Windjammer City Style (Dot, 1958)
 Pee Wee Russell, Portrait of Pee Wee (Counterpoint, 1958)
 Tommy Vig, The Tommy Vig Orchestra (Take V, 1965)
 Helen Humes Midsummer Night's Songs (RCA, 1974)

References

Further reading
 "MCA Sponsors Draftproof Band; Holywood Canteen Kids, Ages From 13 to 16, Set for Summer Theater Tour". Down Beat. June 1, 1943. p. 6.
 Holly, Hal (February 15, 1944). "Los Angeles Band Briefs". Down Beat. p. 6.
 "SAG and Movie Firm Named in Film Credit Case"Down Beat. p. 12.
 "A new generation 'Wonder Drummer' zooms higher and higher with the famous Jimmy Dorsey Band". Down Beat. October 7, 1946, p. 15.
 "Gene Krupa ... Slingerland; National Swing Drummers Contest". Down Beat. February 25, 1948. p. 17.
 Whiston, Henry F. (February 22, 1952). "Tommy Praises Brother Jimmy Dorsey's Band; 'Beat' Reviewer Agrees". Down Beat. p. 2.
 "Star Performers – Kiffe and Ludwig". Down Beat. p. 2.
 Krupa, Gene (1970). "The Voice of Broadway". The Wilkes-Barre Record''. p. 16.

External links

Audio
 "Hollywood Bazaar" – Georgie Auld and His Orchestra at Internet Archive
 "J. D's Jump" – Jimmy Dorsey and His Jammers at Internet Archive

Video
 "All Done, All Through" instrumental interlude w/ drum solo, from Johnny Doughboy (1942) at YouTube
 Trailer for Song of the Open Road (1944) at YouTube

Miscellaneous
 
 
 

1927 births
2004 deaths
American jazz drummers
West Coast jazz drummers
20th-century American drummers
American male drummers
20th-century American male musicians
American male jazz musicians